Dakota Luther (born November 7, 1999) is an American swimmer. She competed in the women's 200 metre butterfly event at the 2017 World Aquatics Championships and placed 15th. On December 15, 2022 she won the women's 200 meter butterfly gold medal at the 2022 FINA World Swimming Championships (25 m) held in Melbourne, Australia. 

She is the daughter of Whitney Hedgepeth, an Olympic gold medalist at the 1996 Atlanta Games.

References

External links
 
 Dakota Luther at SwimSwam
 

1999 births
Living people
American female swimmers
Universiade medalists in swimming
Universiade gold medalists for the United States
Place of birth missing (living people)
Medalists at the 2019 Summer Universiade
21st-century American women
Georgia Bulldogs women's swimmers
Texas Longhorns women's swimmers
Swimmers from Texas
Sportspeople from Austin, Texas
Medalists at the FINA World Swimming Championships (25 m)